Germantown is an unincorporated community located in Anne Arundel County of Maryland, United States, in the Baltimore-Washington Metropolitan Area.

Unincorporated communities in Maryland
Unincorporated communities in Anne Arundel County, Maryland